The Sawfish harvester is a submersible robot produced by the Triton Logging Inc.  It is designed for cutting down  submerged trees and popping them to the surface, with large pincers and a chainsaw.  Such trees are generally submerged when dams are built near existing forests, and their wood remains good while underwater for long periods.

External links
 News report on the Sawfish
 Triton Engineering page: details on the Sawfish

Underwater robots
2000s robots
Robots of Canada